Baima (born April 1946) is a Chinese politician of Tibetan ethnicity who served as chairman of the Qinghai Provincial Committee of the Chinese People's Political Consultative Conference between 2007 and 2012.

He was a member of the 16th CCP Central Commission for Discipline Inspection. He was a member of the 11th National Committee of the Chinese People's Political Consultative Conference.

Biography
Baima was born in Yushu County (now Yushu Tibetan Autonomous Prefecture), Qinghai, in April 1946. In August 1960, he was admitted to Yushu Tibetan Autonomous Prefecture Normal School, he stayed at the school and taught there after graduation.

He got involved in politics in December 1967, when he was appointed deputy director of Chindu County Revolutionary Committee, and joined the Chinese Communist Party in October 1968. He rose to become deputy party secretary of the county in October 1973. He was deputy director of Qinghai Provincial Bureau of Education in June 1976, and held that office until January 1980. In January 1980, he became deputy secretary of the Qinghai Provincial Committee of the Communist Youth League of China, rising to secretary the next year. In April 1983, he was made deputy director of Qinghai Provincial Department of Animal Husbandry, but having held the position for only two years. In November 1985, he was named acting governor of Hainan Tibetan Autonomous Prefecture, confirmed in April 1986. In January 1993, he was promoted to become vice governor of Qinghai, a position he held until November 2001, when he was appointed deputy party secretary of Qinghai and secretary of Qinghai Provincial Commission for Discipline Inspection. In February 2007, he was proposed as chairman of the Qinghai Provincial Committee of the Chinese People's Political Consultative Conference, the province's top political advisory body. 

References

1946 births
Living people
Tibetan politicians
People from Yushu Tibetan Autonomous Prefecture
Central Party School of the Chinese Communist Party alumni
People's Republic of China politicians from Qinghai
Chinese Communist Party politicians from Qinghai
Members of the 11th Chinese People's Political Consultative Conference